Old Mrs. Fitzgerald is a 1939 detective novel by the British writer Anne Hocking. It was the first novel in her long-running series featuring Chief Inspector William Austen of Scotland Yard. Austen was one of a large number of investigators operating during the Golden Age of Detective Fiction.

References

Bibliography
 Hubin, Allen J. 1981-1985 Supplement to Crime Fiction, 1749-1980. Garland Pub., 1988.
 Reilly, John M. Twentieth Century Crime & Mystery Writers. Springer, 2015.

1939 British novels
British mystery novels
British thriller novels
British crime novels
Novels by Anne Hocking
British detective novels
Geoffrey Bles books